Fanny Hesse (born Angelina Fanny Eilshemius, June 22, 1850 – December 1, 1934) is best known for her work in microbiology alongside her husband, Walther Hesse. Following her initial suggestion of using agar as an alternative to gelatin, they were instrumental in pioneering agar's usage as a common gelling agent for producing media capable of culturing microorganisms at high temperatures.

Biography

Early life and childhood 
Hesse was born in 1850 in New York City to Gottfried Eilshemius, a wealthy import merchant, and his wife, Ceclie Elise. Her family is of Dutch descent. Hesse was the oldest of ten children, five of whom died early on in their lives, and they were raised at Laurel Hill Manor in North Arlington, New Jersey. She and her sisters learned about cooking and housekeeping from their mother beginning at an early age. At the age of 15, she attended a finishing school in Switzerland to study French and home economics.

Later life and family 
Hesse met her husband and research partner, Walther Hesse, in 1872 while traveling in Germany with her sister Eugenie. The couple became engaged in 1873, and they married in 1874 with a wedding held in Geneva. She and her family would later would live in Strehlen, a suburb of Dresden, as a result of Walther purchasing a house to work from home at during his time at the Technical University of Dresden. Referred to as Lina in her family, Hesse and her husband had 3 sons. Hesse is the granddaughter of the Swiss painter Leopold Robert, and she and her brother Louis Eilshemius both shared an early interest and talent for painting and illustrations, with Louis earning some fame for his work later on in his life.

Hesse would end up outliving her husband by 23 years, and her illustrations and Walther's papers have been passed down to her grandchildren as part of her personal collection. Following Walther's death, she moved into the town to be closer to her family and children for the remainder of her life. During World War I, the Hesse family home in New Jersey was sold and her part of the inheritance was kept as enemy property. It was not until many years later that she began to receive small sums of money and other items included with her inheritance, in addition to the pension she received as a widow of a civil servant. However, as her home in Dresden was destroyed during Allied air raids, many of the Hesse family mementos have been lost aside from those that Hesse managed to collect from family members.

Research contributions

Laboratory assistance 
In addition to her housekeeping duties, Hesse worked in an unpaid capacity to assist her husband through preparing bacterial growth media, cleaning equipment, and producing illustrations for scientific publications. Hesse became familiar with her husband's work over time, performing a role similar to a modern-day medical technologist. She also performed a role as a scientific illustrator, drawing highly accurate watercolor images depicting each growth phase of intestinal bacterial culture when viewed under magnification, and her illustrations were included in her husband’s work that was published in 1908 as part of her work in the development of medical illustration. At the time of her recommendation for agar as a plating medium, Hesse was also helping her husband culture air-borne bacteria.

Suggestion of agar 

In 1881, while her husband was working in the laboratory of German physician and microbiologist Robert Koch, he struggled with performing experiments on gelatin medium that liquified due to gelatin-liquefying organisms and temperature increases during incubation. Before the suggestion to use agar, Walter Hesse and Koch had attempted using potato slices as a medium to culture pure colonies. Once this proved to be unsubstantial, they attempted utilizing a nutrient-rich gelatin media, which still did not provide adequate stability for producing cultures for examination. 

Following unsuccessful attempts of culturing microorganisms on gelatin mediums, Hesse then suggested that agar was preferable to gelatin for cultivating bacteria and other microorganisms. She was aware of the properties of agar as a gelling agent, able to maintain its physical properties at warm temperatures, through her usage of it at home. Hesse had first learned about agar from her mother's friends that had lived in the East Indies, where the seaweed extract itself originates; it was commonly used there as a food ingredient. She initially had been utilizing agar as a replacement for gelatin in dishes she prepared in her kitchen, finding agar more versatile in resisting summer temperatures for fruit jams and jellies, and subsequently suggested it as an alternative when Walther complained to her about gelatin breaking down in the summertime heat.

Hesse's suggestion led to Walther and Koch successfully using agar as a plating medium for cultivating the bacteria that caused tuberculosis. Hesse's suggestion of using agar also proved to be central to her husband's success in analyzing microbial counts in air, as he initially ran into problems with summertime temperatures resulting in liquefaction of gelatin. Subsequent experiments following her suggestion of using agar as an alternative gelling agent revealed its advantages in thermal stability, resistance to liquifying bacterial enzymes, ability to maintain sterility, and benefits for long term storage, which compensated for many of the problems associated with gelatin. In comparison to agar, which could remain solid at temperatures up to 90ºC while settling at temperatures below 45ºC, gelatin liquified at 37ºC, which made it an unsuitable media to plate many types of bacteria in laboratory conditions. Agar-based mediums were capable of providing a firmer media at higher temperatures, which allowed for better plating and isolation of bacterial colonies in the conditions Walther and Koch performed their experiments in.

Although Koch mentioned in an 1882 paper on tuberculosis bacilli that he used agar instead of gelatin, he did not credit either Hesse or mention the reasoning behind why he made the switch. Later on in her life, she chose to keep and take care of all of her illustrations and Walther's papers and documents, out of respect for Walther's work and her own contributions to his discoveries. The Hesses chose to not exploit their contributions with agar commercially, citing the action as improper conduct. Hesse's contribution never resulted in financial benefit for the Hesse family, but continues to remain central to the fields of microbiology and bacteriology in regards to laboratory techniques for producing plating media.

See also 
 Walther Hesse

References

External links 
 AGAR and the Quest to Isolate Pure Cultures
 The Forgotten Woman Who Made Microbiology Possible

American expatriates in Germany
American women scientists
German microbiologists
Women microbiologists
1850 births
1934 deaths